Lossiemouth railway station served the town of Lossiemouth, Moray, Scotland from 1852 to 1964 on the Morayshire Railway.

History 
The station opened on 10 August 1852 by the Morayshire Railway. It was the northern terminus of the line. It closed to both passengers and goods traffic on 6 April 1964. The station building was demolished and the site was replaced with a playground, a bandstand. The platform still survives.

References

External links 

Disused railway stations in Moray
Railway stations in Great Britain opened in 1852
Railway stations in Great Britain closed in 1964
Beeching closures in Scotland
1852 establishments in Scotland
1964 disestablishments in Scotland
Former Great North of Scotland Railway stations
Lossiemouth